Zénith de Strasbourg is an indoor sporting arena and concert hall that is located in the city of Eckbolsheim, Bas-Rhin, in eastern France.

Design
It was designed, in the Postmodern Expressionist style, by Italian architect Massimiliano Fuksas.

Venue
The Zénith de Strasbourg arena has a capacity of 12,079. Thus, making it the biggest Zénith in France. It opened in 2008, one of the Le Zénith series of similar venues throughout France.

See also
 List of indoor arenas in France

References

External links

  

Indoor arenas in France
Music venues in France
Sports venues in Strasbourg
Expressionist architecture
Postmodern architecture
Modernist architecture in France
Sports venues completed in 2008
Massimiliano Fuksas buildings
21st-century architecture in France